Rolando José Tornés (born 7 November 1956) is a Cuban judoka. He competed in the men's half-heavyweight event at the 1980 Summer Olympics.

References

1956 births
Living people
Cuban male judoka
Olympic judoka of Cuba
Judoka at the 1980 Summer Olympics
Place of birth missing (living people)